Aenigmacaris is an extinct genus of malacostracan crustacean, which includes the species Aenigmacaris cornigerum and Aenigmacaris minima.  Their closest extant relatives are the mantis shrimp.

References

Prehistoric Malacostraca
Prehistoric crustacean genera
Fossil taxa described in 1978
Carboniferous arthropods of North America